Samuel W. Nolan (died September 30, 1997) was an American police officer for the Chicago Police Department who served as the interim superintendent of the department briefly from April 25, 1979 or September 1, 1979 (sources differ) until January 11, 1980. Nolan was the first African American to serve in any capacity as head of the Chicago Police Department (it would not be until Fred Rice Jr. was appointed superintendent in August 1983 that the city of Chicago would have an African American serve as head of police in a permanent capacity).

Biography

Chicago Police Department 
Nolan first joined the Chicago Police Department in 1945, working as a foot patrol officer for three years and a robbery detective for ten years. In his early police career, Nolan twice wounded robbers and once fired at a fleeing rapist, forcing the rapist to stop. In 1962, superintendent Orlando Winfield Wilson appointed Nolan the head of the police department's human relations unit, established to deal with "racial, religious, or nationalistic incidents". In 1965, Nolan took a leave of absence from the police department to serve as deputy director of the Chicago Commission on Human Relations.

In July 1967, James H. Conlisk Jr., two days after taking office as police superintendent, named Nolan as deputy superintendent, heading the newly-created Community Services Division. Nolan resigned from the Chicago Commission on Human Relations in order to accept this position. In taking this position, Nolan became the highest ranking black officer in the Chicago Police Department. In 1970, Nolan was named deputy superintendent for community relations.

In 1975, Nolan was elected the first African American president of the Saint Jude Police League, a fraternal order for the Chicago Police Department which had 13,000 members at the time, consisting of law enforcement officers, as well as correctional and administrative employees in law enforcement in Cook County and Chicago. Nolan had been a member for the previous 25 years.

In 1977, after the Humboldt Park riot, mayor Michael Anthony Bilandic appointed Nolan and deputy commissioner Hugh Osborne and to represent the city in meetings with Latino community groups. In July 1979, mayor Jane M. Byrne created the position of public safety commissioner, naming Nolan its inaugural appointee. The position saw Nolan become the second highest-salaried municipal employee, behind only the mayor herself.

Interim superintendent 
On April 25, 1979 or September 1, 1979 (sources differ), Nolan was appointed interim superintendent of police after Joseph DiLeonardi, who had been serving as interim superintendent of police, was relieved of his duty by mayor Jane Byrne. Even before Nolan became interim superintendent, there had been a push from part of the city's African American community to get Byrne to appoint Nolan the city's first black permanent police superintendent, but she did not, instead appointing Richard J. Brzeczek, a white man, as the next permanent chief of police. Nolan's term as interim superintendent ended on January 11, 1980, when Richard J. Brzeczek was appointed.

Subsequent career and nonprofit work 
After holding several positions with the Cook County Sheriff's Office, in 1986, he was named the chief of the Cook County Sheriff's Police Department. Nolan served as the director of investigations for the Illinois Attorney General. Nolan served on the boards of Loyola University Chicago, the Illinois Humane Society, and the Institute of Urban Life.

Later life and death 
In 1993, Nolan moved to Hilton Head Island, South Carolina. Nolan married his wife Agnes. Nolan died at his home in South Carolina on September 30, 1997, aged 78.

References 

1997 deaths
Superintendents of the Chicago Police Department
African-American police officers